The Una and the Lion was a British £5 gold coin depicting Queen Victoria. It is recognized as one of the most beautiful British coins ever struck. It was designed by William Wyon in 1839, to commemorate the beginning of Queen Victoria's reign (in 1837). The coins were first produced in 1839 and were probably intended for collector sets rather than for circulation. The production ran to a few hundred coins including a number of variations such as different metals, different hairbands on the depiction of the queen, different edge types, and a variation in the reverse inscription.

The coin is the lightest of the British £5 coins, weighing only 38.7–39.3 grams.

Obverse
The obverse of the coin shows Victoria's head, and the Latin phrase "VICTORIA D G BRITANNIARUM REGINA F D – "Victoria by the Grace of God, Queen of the British Territories, Defender of the Faith" - is inscribed around the head.

Reverse

The reverse of the coin is a depiction of Queen Victoria walking to the left of a lion. The Latin phrase DIRIGE DEUS GRESSUS MEOS – "May God direct my steps". There is also a variant of the inscription with DIRIGIT instead of DIRIGE. Underneath the lion are the Roman Numerals "MDCCCXXXIX" (1839).

The same Latin inscription appears on the 2012 Royal Mint £5 Crown, minted to commemorate the Diamond Jubilee of Queen Elizabeth II.

The reverse design, with a Roman numeral date of MM and then "2000 AD." below instead of Wyon's signature, was used for a silver one ounce coin of the Milestones of the Millennium series.

The depiction of the young Queen as Lady Una (a character from Edmund Spenser's poem The Faerie Queene, from 1590) was seen at the time as a bold design decision as it was the first occasion when a British monarch had been depicted on a coin as a fictional character. Queen Victoria, as Una, is depicted holding a sceptre while the lion, Lady Una's guardian, represents England.

References

British gold coins
Works based on The Faerie Queene
Cultural depictions of Queen Victoria

External links
 A history of Una and the Lion